Raz Zehavi (born December 1, 1971) is an Israeli former footballer who spent most of his career as the goalkeeper of Hapoel Hadera in the second tier of Israeli football. He now works as a regular commentator on the Israeli Sport 5 TV channel.

References

External links
 

1971 births
Living people
Israeli Jews
Israeli footballers
Hapoel Hadera F.C. players
F.C. Bu'eine players
Footballers from Hadera
Association football commentators
Survivor (Israeli TV series) contestants
Association football goalkeepers